This list of Anuran families shows all extant families of Anura. Anura is an order of animals in the class Amphibia that includes frogs and toads. More than 5,000 species are described in the order. The living anurans are typically divided into three suborders: Archaeobatrachia, Mesobatrachia, and Neobatrachia. This classification is based on such morphological features as the number of vertebrae, the structure of the pectoral girdle, and the morphology of tadpoles.

Taxonomy
The archaeobatrachians are the most primitive of frogs. These frogs have morphological characteristics which are found mostly in extinct frogs, and are absent in most of the modern frog species. Most of these characteristics are not common between all the families of Archaeobatrachia, or are not absent from all the modern species of frogs. However, all archaeobatrachians have free vertebrae, whereas all other species of frogs have their ribs fused to their vertebrae.

The Neobatrachia comprise the most modern species of frogs. Most of these frogs have morphological features which are more complex than those of the mesobatrachians and archaeobatrachians. The neobatrachians all have a palatine bone, which braces the upper jaw to the neurocranium. This is absent in all Archaeobatrachia and some Mesobatrachia. The third distal carpus is fused with the remaining carpal bones. The adductor longus muscle is present in the neobatrachians, but absent in the archaeobatrachians and some mesobatrachians. It is believed to have differentiated from pectineus muscle, and this differentiation has not occurred in the primitive frogs. 

The Mesobatrachia are considered the evolutionary link between the Archaeobatrachia and the Neobatrachia. The families within the mesobatrachian suborder generally contain morphological features typical of both the other suborders. For example, the palatine bone is absent in all archaeobatrachians, and present in all neobatrachians. However, within the mesobatrachians families, it can be dependent on the species as to whether the palatine bone is present.

Due to the many morphological features which separate the frogs, many different systems are used for the classification of the anuran suborders. These different classification systems usually split the Mesobatrachia suborder.

Families

References

Anuran
Anuran